Mary Ann Glynn is an American academic. She is the Joseph F. Cotter Professor of Management and Organization at Boston College's Carroll School of Management, and the president of the Academy of Management.

References

American women academics
Boston College faculty
Columbia University alumni
Fordham University alumni
Living people
Long Island University alumni
Rider University alumni
Year of birth missing (living people)